The 2018 Equatoguinean Primera División is the 40th season of the Equatoguinean Primera División, the top-tier football league in Equatorial Guinea, since its establishment in 1979. The season started on 26 May 2018.

First stage
Divided into Región Insular and Región Continental. Top three teams from each region qualify for the final stage.

After 21 rounds (5 August 2018):

Final stage
Qualified teams: 
Región Insular: Leones Vegetarianos, Deportivo Unidad, Atlético Semu
Región Continental: Deportivo Niefang, Futuro Kings, 15 de Agosto

Final positions:
Leones Vegetarianos (qualified for the 2018–19 CAF Champions League)
Deportivo Unidad (qualified for the 2018–19 CAF Confederation Cup)

References
Notes

Citations

External links
FEGUIFUT

Football leagues in Equatorial Guinea
Youth
Equatorial Guinea